Stauber is a surname. Notable people with the surname include:
Allan Stauber (born 1944), American bridge player
Jack Stauber (born 1996), American musician, YouTuber and animator
Jenny Stauber, Australian ecotoxicologist
John Stauber (born 1953), American writer and activist
Larry Stauber (born 1947), American judge
Pete Stauber (born 1966), American politician from Minnesota
Robb Stauber (born 1967), American ice hockey player

See also
24547 Stauber, a main-belt minor planet